Reynolda Village is a shopping and business complex in Winston-Salem, North Carolina created from the servant and agricultural buildings of the former R. J. Reynolds estate, Reynolda. At present, it is owned and operated by Wake Forest University. It is the location of the first Village Tavern in the restaurant chain. Dough Joe's, a cafe and doughnut shop located in Reynolda Village, is considered one of the finer restaurants in Winston-Salem. Reynolda Gardens is adjacent to the village.

References

Buildings and structures in Winston-Salem, North Carolina
Wake Forest University